Mukadam Asiwaju Asiru Idris FCA is a Nigerian government official and diplomat serving as the Commissioner of Finance since 2016. He previously served as the Special Adviser on Finance Economy, Commerce and Investment to the Governor of Kogi State from January 2016 to November 2019 under Governor Yahaya Bello. He was reappointed as Commissioner of Finance, Budget and Economic Planning in January 2020 a position he held till date.

Early life and Education 
Mukadam Asiwaju Asiru Idris was born on December 11, 1975, in Isanlu, Yagba East LGA, to Asiru Ijagbemi, a farmer and Hajia Hawawu Ijagbemi, a trader, and the iyaoloja of Bagido in Isanlu.

He obtained Nigeria Certificate in Education (NCE) in Economics/Mathematics from College of Education, Oro in Kwara State. He also attended Ahmadu Bello University, Zaria, He is a master's degree Holder of Accounting from the Kogi State University, Ayingba.

Career

Early career 

Mukadam Asiwaju Asiru Idris started as an Executive Assistant, Head teller in Zenith bank. In 2006, he became the Senior Executive Assistant, Vault Administration/Cash Officer with the same bank.

Asiwaju was promoted to Assistant Manager, Head Corporate Banking Group where he managed the bank's relationship with assigned companies with turnover in excess of $30million.

Civil career 

The Economic and Investment Management Team was established and saddled with the responsibility to interact and brainstorm with investors in other to arrive at theist investment for the State.

Awards and honours 

Overall Best 100 Level Accounting Student, Ahmadu Bello University, Zaria 1996

Overall Best 200 Level Accounting Student, Ahmadu Bello University, Zaria 1997

MD/CEO letter of commendation for Team Player, Zenith Bank Plc, 2002

MD/CEO award for the best operational efficiency cash officer in the North, Zenith Bank Plc, 2006.

Award for Financial Transparency by World Bank.

References 

Nigerian people
Nigerian diplomats
1975 births
Nigerian bankers
Nigerian government officials
Living people